Motionhouse is a dance-circus company based in Royal Leamington Spa, Warwickshire. Founded in 1988, Motionhouse operates under the direction of Louise Richards and Kevin Finnan MBE and the company aims to create startling, passionate dance theatre that fuses images, action and dynamism to surprise, challenge and delight their audiences. Imagery, theatricality and immediate impact combine with modern, contemporary dance and a focus on accessibility. Motionhouse also draw on theatre, circus, acrobatics and film to create performance spectacle with meaningful and resonant content which speaks directly to people through imagery and physicality.

In 2017 director Kevin Finnan MBE became first Visiting Professor of Dance at Birmingham City University’s Royal Birmingham Conservatoire. He has an MA in Contemporary Performing Arts from University College Bretton Hall and a PhD in Theatre from Warwick University. He is a Research Fellow at the University of Warwick and Associate Artist of Greenwich+Docklands International Festival. In 2013 he was made an honorary Doctor of Letters at the University of Warwick in recognition of the importance of his work and his service to the arts. He was awarded an MBE in 2013 for his services to dance

History
Motionhouse was commissioned to produce a spectacular outdoor event which formed part of the opening weekend celebrations of the London 2012 Festival in the West Midlands. The Voyage was created in partnership with Sydney’s aerialists Legs On The Wall. The Voyage featured film from Logela Multimedia, a life-size oceangoing liner and a cast of hundreds. The Voyage was produced by Birmingham Hippodrome and was performed in Victoria Square, Birmingham from 21–24 June 2012.

An enormous ship will sail into the centre of Victoria Square, Birmingham, docking itself beside the city’s Town Hall. High above the people who gather to look at this marvel, dancers and aerialists appear in the ship’s rigging – the voyage begins.
The Voyage will be one of five large-scale events commissioned for the London 2012 Festival. The Voyage is a story that explores what this means for us all: departures and arrivals, hopes and fears, expectations and disappointments.
Professional dancers and aerialists will join forces with a huge amateur choir, live musicians and over 140 community performers to transform the Square and tell the story.
In the run up to The Voyage Motionhouse will be running a participatory project called Quest which offers young people from the West Midlands the chance to be part of the London 2012 celebrations. From March 2012 Motionhouse will be creating material with 8 community groups which they will then go on to perform in The Voyage.

Motionhouse  won the Audience Award in the National Dance Awards 2005, as well as winning the Audience Prize for the MiramirO Festival in 2009 and is currently on the GCSE syllabus for dance in England and Wales.  The structure of Perfect is thematic rather than narrative and explores the concept of time.

Motionhouse has produced 18 full-length, middle-scale touring productions and a series of dance spectacles in sights and spaces throughout the UK. The 2005 production Perfect won critical acclaim  and is currently on the GCSE syllabus for dance in England and Wales. The structure of Perfect is thematic rather than narrative and explores the concept of time.

Motionhouse currently employs eight professional dancers and in 2011 it toured in seven different countries throughout the world.

In its first year of touring, Scattered, Motionhouse’s 18th theatre production opened the Sibiu International Theatre Festival in Romania where it was deemed the “revelation of the festival” by the event director. Scattered continues to tour into 2012 and beyond and completed its first international tour in 2011, taking in dates in Macau, Belgium and Portugal as well as a return visit to Romania. Tours of Scattered are planned for the China in autumn 2012 and Motionhouse has also been taken on by IMGA Artists who are currently representing the company in USA, Asia/Pacific and Europe and are building a tour of Scattered planned for the United States in spring 2013.
 The tour is set to continue into 2012 at various venues in the UK, Europe, China and USA.

Motionhouse have 3 festival pieces in rep,  Cascade, Underground and Chaser which are widely performed across the UK and Europe. Generally, these pieces require fewer dancers than the theatre touring pieces, are smaller and therefore more flexible and easier to tour  and are usually shorter (lasting from fifteen to twenty five minutes). As a result, the company can perform at simultaneous festivals in different locations, performing more than once a day. Motionhouse’s 2008 piece Underground won the Audience Prize at the MiramirO Festival in Ghent, Belgium in 2009.
In 2011, Motionhouse had the opportunity to reunite with some JCB diggers and create two new pieces in their Machine Dance collection. Waiting Game premiered on 3 March and is a playful and audacious trio of 2 dancers and a JCB digger which takes place in a familiar restaurant situation. Turning dining out on its head, the 2 dancers are waited on by a JCB - but the quality of the service leaves something to be desired!

Traction followed in November, commissioned by Birmingham Bullring and with the number of diggers and dancers tripling the Machine Dance made a climactic celebration to launch a new development to the shopping centre complex. Traction is a stunning Transformers-esque performance that sees 6 dancers and 3 JCB diggers dancing together with extreme acrobatic partnering, animal-like strength and startling unison phrases.
Traction is a high voltage celebration of the powerful harmony of humans and machines and is at once impossibly emotive and theatrically unforgettable, defying gravity and suspending disbelief.

Motionhouse provides community education programs, as well as outreach and community work in its campaign for wider and more accessible dance education.

Funding
Motionhouse is a National Portfolio Organisation of Arts Council England and receives support from Warwick District Council.[10] Following the 2010 Coalition Government's Comprehensive Spending Review Motionhouse have seen their funding cut from around £270k to £250k.

On 30 March 2011 further funding decisions were announced by Arts Council England. In this round Motionhouse received a further cut to their funding of around 11% whereas 4 other West Midlands-based dace organisations all received significant uplifts and another Warwickshire based arts organisation, Live and Local, became part of the National Portfolio with a rise in funding of 80%.

Productions
Charge (2015) -Inspired by the role of electricity in the human body, Charge, is a multi-media show about energy. From the electrical charge that sparks human life, to the beating of hearts and the memories we make, six performers use dance and acrobatics to delve deep into the human body, tracing the story of energy in our lives.
Broken (2013) - Broken examines our precarious relationship with the earth. Hanging in suspense and scrambling to safety, the dancers negotiate the cracks and craters of this world of illusions where nothing is quite as it seems. 
The Voyage (2012) - The Voyage has been commissioned to celebrate the opening weekend of the London 2012 Festival in the West Midlands. The Voyage was created in partnership with Australia’s world-renowned aerialists Legs On The Wall. The Olympics attracts individuals and groups from across the globe, crossing oceans on a quest for adventure, pursuing their dreams. The Voyage is a story that explored what this means for us all: departures and arrivals, hopes and fears, expectations and disappointments.
Traction (2011) - A high voltage celebration of the powerful harmony of humans and machines and is at once impossibly emotive and theatrically unforgettable, defying gravity and suspending disbelief.
Waiting Game (2011) - A playful and audacious trio of 2 dancers and a JCB digger which takes place in a familiar restaurant situation.
Cascade (2010) - Festival piece exploring flooding. Premiered 3 July 2010 at Greenwich+Docklands International Festival.
Scattered (2009) - Combining dance with film technology, Scattered explores our relationship with water. Music by Sophy Smith and film by Logela Multimedia; with a set by Simon Dormon and lighting by Natasha Chivers.
Underground (2008) - Commissioned by Birmingham Hippodrome, Fierce! Festival and Without Walls, Underground is a festival piece exploring the modern realities of train travel.
Run! (2008) - A large-scale spectacle for Greenwich+Docklands International Festival which explored sport and dance. Music by Errolyn Wallen.
Driven (2007) - Explored love and loss, jealousy and desire, ambition, socialising and isolation.
Chaser (2005) - Motionhouse's festival performance exploring the modern social rituals and challenges stemming from meeting strangers. Created with the support of Lichfield Garrick, mac, Solihull Arts Complex and Birmingham Hippodrome.
Dreams and Ruin (2005) - Site specific performance at Witley Court in Worcestershire with 250 local performers developed in partnership with DanceFest, Worcester Arts Workshop, ACE Dance and Music and Angela Woodhouse.
Perfect (2005) - Performed on a bed of sand and on bungee harnesses, Perfect was the third in a trilogy (following Fearless and Volatile) about the human relationship with time.
Renaissance (2005) - Performed on waste land in London's East End featuring cranes, diggers (Machine Dance), pyrotechnics and aerial work.
Road To The Beach: The Edge (2004) - Large scale production with visual performance, giant sand castles, dancing diggers in a performance called Machine Dance, and extreme sports performed on the beach at Watergate Bay, Cornwall along with 1000 children and adults from the local community.
Dancing Inside (2004) - Therapeutic project designed and run by Motionhouse with nine residents of HMP Dovegate in Staffordshire. A twenty-month project ending with a performance by the inmates to the prison community.
Volatile (2002) - Explored the mystery and struggle involved in trying to communicate truthfully with someone else. Music by Sophie Smith and Tim Dickinson.
Fearless (2001) - Large scale touring piece which examined phobias such as falling or flying and open or closed spaces. Performed on a massive steel tubular structure created by Simon Dormon.
Atomic (1999) - Explored tiny worlds and shared spaces. Motionhouse's first festival piece for multi scale touring.
Twisted (1999) - Explored the news that something had been released into the atmosphere. Examines whether knowledge can be established without sight or smell.
Faking It (1998) - Motionhouse's tenth anniversary piece about power games and theatrical illusion.
Delicate (1996) - Examined the dark side of human need and desire with a script by A.L Kennedy and music composed by Howard Skempton, performed by Birmingham Contemporary Music Group.
Geisha (1995) - A commission by Warwick Arts Centre for its 20th anniversary, a dance about role play and identity choreographed by Louise Richards and Kevin Finnan.
Flying (1994) - Performed on, in and around a giant steel set created by Simon Dormon and steel artist Davey Boyle. Music by Alain Bauman.
Punch (1994) - Three men struggle on a totem of male imagery with music by Jesus Jones, Kronos Quartet, Curve and Sundial.
Arcadio/Déjà Vu (1993) - Featured a set by Spanish installation artist Rosa Sanchez
 The Curtsy Play (1992) - Choreographed by Louise Richards, this piece examined the plight of female psychiatric patients. Created with a Bonnie Bird British Choreography Award.
Speed and Light (1992) - First of Motionhouse's combinations of theatre and film. Film by Christopher Gowans and music by Ray Lee and Harry Dawes.
House of Bones (1991) - A study of victims of ancient and modern plague and our attitudes towards them. Music by Paul Newham.
The Ticking Man (1990) - Explored the mechanics deception and the nature of truth and lies. Set created by Simon Dormon, music by Harry Dawes and Ray Lee.
A Curious Day (1989) - Motionhouse's first major project, Southern Arts Board's first dance and education project, toured to schools before being invited to London and the Far East. Music by Harry Dawes and Simon Prince.

References

External links
Motionhouse 
Films of Motionhouse performances
Guardian dance review (2009)
New York Times dance review (2013)

Dance companies in the United Kingdom
Contemporary dance in the United Kingdom
1988 establishments in the United Kingdom
Performing groups established in 1988